Murrow is a 1986 biographical drama television film directed by Jack Gold, written by Ernest Kinoy,  and originally broadcast by HBO. Daniel J. Travanti played the title role of American broadcast journalist Edward R. Murrow, and Robert Vaughn co-starred in the supporting role of Franklin D. Roosevelt.  The cast also featured Dabney Coleman as CBS President William Paley.

Plot
The movie begins during the early days of World War II when Murrow was a combat correspondent in London broadcasting to the United States. Murrow courageously reports from the front lines and even goes on bombing missions. During a White House visit after Pearl Harbor, President Roosevelt tells Murrow he is the most influential American in England.

After the war, Murrow continues his radio career and eventually expands into television with his popular See It Now show. He eventually makes his most famous broadcast attacking Wisconsin Senator Joseph McCarthy and his brutal tactics. He is credited with helping topple McCarthy. Throughout all of this, Murrow is a man of unimpeachable honor and integrity. This brings him into conflict with his network superiors who care more about profits and ratings.

Murrow eventually leaves television and becomes the Director of the United States Information Agency. A heavy chain-smoker, he contracts lung cancer and dies at the age of 57.

Cast
 Daniel J. Travanti as Edward R. Murrow
 Dabney Coleman as CBS Chairman William S. Paley
 John McMartin as CBS President Frank Stanton
 Edward Herrmann as Fred Friendly
 Stephen Churchett as BBC Technician
 Robert Vaughn as President Franklin D. Roosevelt
 Kathryn Leigh Scott as Janet Murrow
 Martyn Stanbridge as Lancaster Captain
 Philip Voss as Censor
 Lorelei King as Waitress

Reception
The Los Angeles Times described it as "provocative", and Time described a "storm of protest" concerning its portrayal of CBS executives.

References

External links
 

1986 television films
1986 films
American biographical films
Biographical films about journalists
Films about McCarthyism
Films directed by Jack Gold
Films scored by Carl Davis
Films set in the 20th century
Films set in the United States
HBO Films films
1980s English-language films
1980s American films